Kötcse is a village in Somogy county, Hungary. The village is known for being a summer resort because of its proximity to Lake Balaton and its good weather conditions. Several houses are weekend houses and have no permanent residents. Among others former Prime Minister and leader of the DK political party, Ferenc Gyurcsány spends his holidays here with his family. Since 2004 the settlement and the Dobozy Chateau hosts the Polgári Piknik meeting organized by the Polgári Magyarországért Alapítvány of the Christian-conservative elite. Leading figures of Hungarian life - politicians, thinkers, scientists, business people - gather together in the village for the event.

The settlement is part of the Balatonboglár wine region.

Etymology
The name Kötcse derives from a personal name Kékcse which is the combination of the word kék and the affix -cse. The name of the village changed with time from Kékcse to Kötcse.

Geography
It is located in the northern part of Somogy County, 9 km from Lake Balaton, approx. 130–260 meters above sea level. Kötcse is just 400 meters away from the closest village, Nagycsepely. The closest town is Balatonföldvár 15 km away. The nearest railway station is located in Somogymeggyes about 6 km away. The settlement is part of the Balatonboglár Wine Region.

History
Kötcse was first mentioned by Andrew II of Hungary in 1229 as Keccha inferior (Lower-Kötcse) and Keccha superior (Upper-Kötcse). In the 14th and 15th century it was owned by cathedral chapter of the Diocese of Székesfehérvár. During the Turkish occupation the village perished. Later the Antall family brought here Lutheran Germans from Hesse to revive the settlement.

In most settlements of Somogy County, like in Kötcse, several small manor houses and mansions were built in the 18th century. There were 19 mansions of small landowner noble people in Kötcse. For now just 9 of them survived.

Main sights
 archeological finds from the new stone age and ancient times
 coins from the middle ages
 9 of the former 19 noble mansions (e.g. Kazay Mansion, Keserű Mansion, Antall Mansion, Bíró Mansion (Békavár), Csepinszky Mansion)
 Lutheran Church (built in late Baroque style, 18th century)

Notable residents
 Atala Kisfaludy (1836–1911) poet, first female member of the Petőfi Society
 István Roboz (1828–1916) journalist, founder of the first county weekly newspaper called Somogy

External links 
 Street map (Hungarian)

Literature
 Zoltán Tefher : Kötcse - A község telepítéstörténete

References 

Populated places in Somogy County
Hungarian German communities in Somogy County